As of 2010, Atlanta is the seventh-most visited city in the United States, with over 35 million visitors per year. The city was the 12th most popular destination for overseas visitors, who numbered 712,000 in total (2010).

Atlanta's premier tourist attraction is the world's largest aquarium, the Georgia Aquarium, located a  site at Pemberton Place that is also home to the World of Coca-Cola and within walking distance of Centennial Olympic Park, Mercedes-Benz Stadium, State Farm Arena, the CNN Center and other downtown Atlanta tourist attractions.

The Jackson Street Bridge in Old Fourth Ward is one of Atlanta's most iconic landmarks and a highly popular photo destination for tourists due to the city's downtown skyline and major highways in the background.

Atlanta also attracts visitors with its performing arts venues, museums and historical sites, parks, cuisine, and its many festivals and events.

Sites of interest to tourists

Atlanta Botanical Garden
Atlanta Civic Center
Atlanta Contemporary Art Center
Atlanta Cyclorama & Civil War Museum
Atlanta History Center
Atlanta Monetary Museum
APEX Museum
CNN Center
Callanwolde Center for Fine Arts
Carter Center
Centennial Olympic Park
Center for Puppetry Arts
Chastain Park Amphitheater
Children's Museum of Atlanta
College Football Hall of Fame
Delta Flight Museum
Fernbank Forest
Fernbank Museum of Natural History
Fernbank Science Center
Fox Theatre
Georgia Aquarium
Georgia World Congress Center
Grant Park
Herndon Home
High Museum of Art
Lakewood Amphitheatre
LEGOLAND Discovery Center Atlanta
Lenox Square

Kennesaw Mountain
Margaret Mitchell House
Martin Luther King, Jr. National Historic Site
Mary Mac's Tea Room
Mercedes-Benz Stadium
Michael C. Carlos Museum
Millennium Gate
Museum of Contemporary Art of Georgia
Museum of Design Atlanta
National Center for Civil and Human Rights
National Museum of Patriotism
Oakland Cemetery
Phipps Plaza
Plaza Theatre
Piedmont Park
Robert C. Williams Paper Museum
Six Flags Over Georgia
Six Flags White Water
Southeastern Railway Museum
State Farm Arena
Stone Mountain Park
Sweet Auburn Curb Market
The Varsity
Underground Atlanta
William Breman Jewish Heritage & Holocaust Museum
Woodruff Arts Center
World of Coca-Cola
Zoo Atlanta

References

External links

City of Atlanta attractions
Atlanta Convention and Visitors Bureau

 
Tourist attractions in Atlanta